Penguin Mints is a brand of caffeinated mints made by Seattle-based ifive brands.  The company also produces caffeinated "energy gum", as well as non-caffeinated mints. The brand was introduced in 1998.

List of products
Caffeinated Peppermints
Caffeinated Cinnamon Mints
Caffeinated Chocolate Mints
Peppermint Energy Gum
Citrus Energy Gum
Kola Energy Gum
Penguin Lights Decaffeinated Peppermints

Active ingredients 
All three varieties of caffeinated mints contain 7mg of caffeine per mint. Five mints are approximately equal to one 12 ounce can of cola.

The energy gum products also contain 7mg of caffeine per piece. In addition, the Kola Energy Gum contains Ginseng and the Citrus Energy Gum contains Taurine and Guarana.

See also
 List of breath mints

References 

Breath mints
American confectionery
Brand name confectionery